Zinevand (also Romanized as Zīnevand and Zeynavand; also known as Zenīvand) is a village in Miyan Kaleh Rural District, in the Central District of Behshahr County, Mazandaran Province, Iran. At the 2006 census, its population was 1,427, in 368 families.

References 

Populated places in Behshahr County